High River may refer to:
 High River, a town in Alberta, Canada
 High River (N.W.T. electoral district), an electoral district of the Northwest Territories, Canada between 1884 and 1905
 High River (provincial electoral district), an electoral district of Alberta between 1905 and 1930
 Alto River, a river of Portugal
 RCAF Station High River